The Mexico women's national 3x3 team is a national basketball team of Mexico, administered by the Asociación Deportiva Mexicana de Basquetbol A.C. ADEMEBA.

It represents the country in international 3x3 (3 against 3) women's basketball competitions.

See also
Mexico women's national basketball team
Mexico men's national 3x3 team

References

External links
 Mexico Basketball Federation

3x3
Women's national 3x3 basketball teams